The Devils River Limestone is a geologic formation in Texas. It preserves fossils dating back to the Cretaceous period.

See also

 List of fossiliferous stratigraphic units in Texas
 Paleontology in Texas

References
 

Limestone formations of the United States
Cretaceous geology of Texas